There have been three baronetcies created in the Baronetage of England for families called Stapleton (also Stapylton). These are all extinct.

 Stapylton baronets of Myton (1660)
 Stapleton baronets of Carlton (1662)
 Stapleton baronets of the Leeward Islands (1679)

Set index articles on titles of nobility